The Kittanning Path was a major east-west Native American trail that crossed the Allegheny Mountains barrier ridge connecting the Susquehanna River valleys in the center of Pennsylvania to the highlands of the Appalachian Plateau and thence to the western lands beyond drained by the Ohio River. Kittanning Village was the first major Delaware (Lenape) Indian settlement along the descent from the Allegheny Plateau.

Nature and the path

The path is made up of a "series of path alternatives" that pass through seasonally or directionally more or less difficult notches— the gaps were among only five places that could be crossed by animal power from east to west across the Appalachian Mountains west of New England. The Kittanny path (by other names) would also come to be used first by Dutch, then English and British colonial fur traders, as well as Amerindian emigrants moving westwards before and after the French and Indian War and in the post-1780 settlers migrations west of the Mountain as the American Revolution entered its final years.

For centuries the Kittanning Path, like the similar Chief Nemacolin's Trail to the south, was the overland route through very tough country for Native American peoples. They included Iroquoian-speaking tribes, such as the Erie, Susquehannock, and the Five Nations of the Iroquois confederacy, as well as the Algonquian-speaking Lenape, Miami, and Siouan Shawnee. Early European explorers and settlers also learned to use the Indian paths to cross the Allegheny Mountains barrier ridge. 

The path made use of one of the few so-called gaps of the Allegheny that accompanied the feedwater streams draining into the Juniata River, a tributary of the Susquehanna that terminated on the Allegheny River due Northeast of Pittsburgh in what is now Armstrong County, Pennsylvania at the Native American Kittanning Village (at present-day Kittanning, Pennsylvania).

By the time of the French and Indian War, starting in 1754, Kittanning Village was believed by Europeans to be the largest Native American village in the Ohio Country west of the Alleghenies. It was located in an area of Pennsylvania that had been closed to white settlement by the original treaty of William Penn with the Lenape.

In an attempt to settle frontier borders and reduce conflict among Indian tribes, the English and Native Americans signed the Treaty of Fort Stanwix after the French and Indian War. It opened some of Pennsylvania west of the Alleghenies to white settlement.  In the 1750s, this area had been the scene of a fierce raids by Native Americans against white settlement, and a major British retribution campaign.

A section of the original path is preserved in northwestern Cambria County.

Description (East to West) 
It began southeast of Altoona at Frankstown on the Juniata River. It ran west, crossing the Allegheny Ridge approximately 5 mi (8 km) west of Altoona at Kittanning Gap, later the location of the Horseshoe Curve railroad site.

The path ran northwest through Cambria County, passing east of Carrolltown. It entered Indiana County approximately 1 mi (1.6 km) south of Cherry Tree at "Canoe Place", the uppermost
Native American canoe portage on the West Branch of the Susquehanna.

It followed a southwest course, through Yellow Creek State Park, then along the headwaters of Two Lick Creek, roughly past Uniontown, Pennsylvania (not the current Uniontown), Cookport, and Diamondville to U.S. Highway 422. It followed the approximate present course of the highway west and NNW through Indiana to Shelocta. It crossed into Armstrong County near Elderton and ended at the village of Kittanning on the east bank of the Allegheny.

History 
The path was in use as early as 1721.  In 1744 the English trader John Hart was granted a license by colonial authorities to trade with the Indians in western Pennsylvania lands, which were then closed to white settlement. Hart established a way station campsite, called Hart's Sleeping Place, near the continental divide in Cambria County. The way station appeared on colonial maps and was used in 1752 by Gov. James Hamilton, and in 1754 by John Harris, the founder of Harrisburg. The last Native American encampment was recorded at the site in 1781.

In the 1750s the path became the raiding route taken by Lenape. Unhappy with a treaty that took away much of their land rights in western Pennsylvania, they raided white settlements in central Pennsylvania. In 1755, the Lenape chief Shingas used the trail to attack British settlements along the Juniata River, returning with captives to the village of Kittanning. In early August 1756, the Lenape used the path for a raid to burn Fort Granville near present-day Lewistown, when they also took prisoners. 

After the fort was burned, the British dispatched Lt. Colonel John Armstrong for retaliation. He pursued the Lenape along the path and camped at Canoe Place in early September; he continued to the village of Kittanning, which he destroyed on 8 September. Armstrong earned the accolade among British colonials as "the Hero of Kittanning" for the raid. He later served as a Major General for the United States in the American Revolutionary War and was elected to the Second Continental Congress.

The path was also traveled by early German pioneer Conrad Weiser, who was accompanied by William Franklin, the son of Benjamin Franklin. Weiser recorded the journey in his journal.

The Kittanning Path is not to be confused with the Kittanning Road, which was built by American rebel forces in 1779 during the Sullivan Expedition. The Kittanning Road followed a more northerly course, running from Kittanning to the site of what is now Olean, New York.

Preservation 
The trail has been surveyed by historians through Cambria County. An authentic section of the original trail is preserved near Eckenrode Mill east of Carrolltown.

See also 
 Natchez Trace
 Nemacolin's Path
 Gaps of the Allegheny
 Cumberland Narrows
 Cumberland Gap

Notes

References

External links 
 Indiana County History
 Joseph Studebaker: The Kittanning Path
 Re-enactment of Kittanning Path hike in 2000
 Kittanning Path Driving Tour
 Village of Kittanning

Native American trails in the United States
Historic trails and roads in Pennsylvania
Lenape
Shawnee history
Trade routes
Transportation in Indiana County, Pennsylvania
Native American history of Pennsylvania